This is a list of glaciers in Russia. It includes glaciers, ice caps and ice domes located in the Russian Federation.

List of glaciers and ice caps

Ice caps

 Academy of Sciences Glacier – Severnaya Zemlya. Largest single ice formation in Russia
 Albanov Glacier – Severnaya Zemlya
 Chernyshev Ice Cap – Franz Josef Land
 De Long East Glacier – Bennett Island. De Long Islands
 De Long West Glacier – Bennett Island. De Long Islands
 Henrietta Island ice cap – De Long Islands
 Jeannette Island ice cap – De Long Islands
 Karpinsky Glacier – Severnaya Zemlya
 Leningradsky ice cap – Severnaya Zemlya
 Malyy Glacier – Bennett Island. De Long Islands
 Pioneer Glacier – Severnaya Zemlya
 Rusanov Glacier – Severnaya Zemlya
 Schmidt Island ice cap – Severnaya Zemlya
 Severny Island ice cap – Novaya Zemlya (Largest glacier complex by area in Europe)
 Toll Glacier – Bennett Island. De Long Islands
 University Glacier – Severnaya Zemlya
 Ushakov Island ice cap – Kara Sea
 Vavilov Glacier – Severnaya Zemlya
 Victoria Island ice cap – near Franz Josef Land

Franz Josef Land ice domes
This section includes ice domes in Franz Josef Land. Some islands have more than one.

 Kupol Arktirazvedki, Wilczek Land
 Kupol Brusilova, Zemlya Georga
 Kupol Dzhensona, Hooker Island
 Kupol Frolova, Payer Island
 Kupol Kropotkina, Alexandra Land, Polyarnykh Letchikov Peninsula
 Kupol Lunnyy, Alexandra Land
 Kupol Moskvy, Hall Island
 Kupol Oblachnyy, Wilczek Land
 Kupol Samoylovicha, Karl-Alexander Island
 Kupol Surova, Becker Island
 Kupol Tindalya, Wilczek Land
 Kupol Tumannyy, Zemlya Georga
 Kupol Vetrenyy, Graham Bell Island
 Kupol Vostok Chetviortyy, Eva Island
 Kupol Vostok Pervyy, Alger Island
 Kupol Vostok Tretiy, Eva Island, Liv Peninsula 
 Kupol Vostok Vtoroy, Rainer Island
Kupol Yuriya, Hooker Island

Glaciers

 Akkem Glacier – Altai
 Anna Glacier – Novaya Zemlya
 Anuchin Glacier – Novaya Zemlya
 Arkhangel Bay Glacier – Novaya Zemlya
 Baksan Glacier or Azau Glacier – Caucasus
 Belukha Glacier – Altai
 Bezengi Glacier – Caucasus
 Brounov Glacier – Novaya Zemlya
 Borzov Glacier – Novaya Zemlya
 Bull Glacier – Novaya Zemlya
 Bunge Glacier – Novaya Zemlya
 Chayev Glacier – Novaya Zemlya
 Chernishev Glacier – Novaya Zemlya
 Devdaraki – Caucasus (Georgia / Russia)
 Dezhnev Glacier – Severnaya Zemlya
 Dykh-Kotyu-Bugoysu – Caucasus
 Gebler Glacier – Altai
 Glazov Glacier – Novaya Zemlya
 Goluboy Glacier – Novaya Zemlya
 Great Taldurin Glacier – Altai
 Grotov Glacier – Severnaya Zemlya
 Inostrantsev Glacier – Novaya Zemlya
 Karaugom Glacier- Caucasus
 Karbasnikov Glacier – Novaya Zemlya
 Kirov Glacier – Franz Josef Land
 Kolka Glacier – Caucasus
 Krayniy Glacier – Novaya Zemlya
 Kropotkin Glacier – Novaya Zemlya
 Kropotkin Glacier – Severnaya Zemlya
 Lakrua Glacier – Novaya Zemlya
 Little Aktru Glacier – Altai
 Little Fisht Glacier – Caucasus
 Mack Glacier – Novaya Zemlya
 Maili Glacier – Caucasus
 Malyutka Glacier – Severnaya Zemlya
 Mashey Glacier – Altai
 Middendorff Glacier – Franz Josef Land
 Molochnyy Glacier – Franz Josef Land
 Molotov Glacier – Severnaya Zemlya
 Moschnyy Glacier – Novaya Zemlya
 Mushketov Glacier – Severnaya Zemlya
 Nansen Glacier – Novaya Zemlya
 Neponyatyy Glacier – Severnaya Zemlya
 Niny Glacier – Franz Josef Land
 Nizkiy Glacier – Novaya Zemlya
 Nordenskiöld Glacier – Franz Josef Land
 Nordenskiöld Glacier, group of four glaciers – Novaya Zemlya
 Vershinsky Glacier
 Novopashenny Glacier, also known as 
 Rozhdestvensky Glacier
 Roze Glacier
 Obruchev Glacier – Franz Josef Land
 Otdel’nyy Glacier – Severnaya Zemlya
 Pavlov Glacier – Novaya Zemlya
 Payer Glacier – Franz Josef Land
 Petersen Glacier – Novaya Zemlya
 Popov Glacier – Novaya Zemlya
 Polisadov Glacier – Novaya Zemlya
 Rikachev Glacier – Novaya Zemlya
 Semyonov-Tyan-Shansky Glacier – Severnaya Zemlya
 Serp i Molot Glacier – Novaya Zemlya
 Severnyy Glacier – Novaya Zemlya
 Shirokiy Glacier – Novaya Zemlya
 Shokalsky Glacier – Novaya Zemlya
 Sonklar Glacier – Franz Josef Land
 Sophia Glacier – Altai 
 Stremitel’nyy Glacier – Franz Josef Land
 Taisiya Glacier – Novaya Zemlya
 Tseyskoe Glacier – Caucasus
 Ukoksky Glacier – Altai 
 Ushkovsky Glacier – Kamchatka 
 Velken Glacier – Novaya Zemlya
 Vera Glacier – Novaya Zemlya
 Vitte Glacier – Novaya Zemlya
 Viz Glacier – Franz Josef Land
 Vize Glacier – Novaya Zemlya
 Voyekov Glacier – Novaya Zemlya
 Worcester Glacier – Franz Josef Land
 Yuzhnyy Glacier – Novaya Zemlya
 Znamenityy Glacier – Franz Josef Land
 Zvezda Glacier – Caucasus

See also
List of glaciers in Europe
List of fjords in Russia

References

External links

 
Russia